The Northern Territory Minister for Essential Services is a Minister of the Crown in the Government of the Northern Territory.

The Minister is responsible for electricity generation and supply operations, public sewerage and drainage services operations, public water supplies operations, and supply and service provision under license. They are also responsible for the Power and Water Corporation, the Power Generation Corporation and the Power Retail Corporation.

The current minister is Eva Lawler (Labor), who succeeded Gerry McCarthy on 7 September 2020 following his retirement from politics.

List of Ministers for Essential Services

References

Northern Territory-related lists
Ministers of the Northern Territory government